Potton is a town and civil parish in Bedfordshire, England.

Potton may also refer to: 

 Potton (1814 ship)
 Potton, Quebec, a Canadian township
 Potton Island, Essex, England
 Potton United F.C., an English football club based in Potton, Bedfordshire
 Richard de Potton (13th-century–c. 1270), a 13th-century English bishop
 Potton End, a village set around a green between Hemel Hempstead and Berkhamsted in Hertfordshire, UK